The 19323/19324 Dr. Ambedkar Nagar - Bhopal Intercity Express is a daily intercity express train which runs between  of Mhow and .

Coach Composition

The train consists of 15 coaches :

 1 AC Chair Car
 3 Reserved Chair Car
 9 Second Class Chair Car
 2 SLR cum Luggage Car

Service

The 19323/Dr. Ambedkar Nagar - Bhopal Intercity Express has an average speed of 52 km/hr and covers 238 km in 4 hrs 35 mins.

The 19324/Bhopal - Dr. Ambedkar Nagar Intercity Express has an average speed of 45 km/hr and covers 238 km in 5 hrs 15 mins.

Route and halts

The important halts of the train are :

Schedule

Rake Sharing

The train shares its rake with 59393/59394 Bhopal - Dahod Fast Passenger.

Traction

Both trains are hauled by a Vadodara Locomotive Shed based WAP-5 or WAP-4E electric locomotive.

References

External links
 

Transport in Mhow
Transport in Bhopal
Railway services introduced in 1995
Rail transport in Madhya Pradesh
Intercity Express (Indian Railways) trains